The copyright laws in Greece are part of the frame of laws which are constantly being adapted to the guidelines of the European Union.

The enforcement of the copyright laws varies from case to case. Greece has attracted attention because of its extended copyright infringement of software and music. The Greek government has tried to impose countermeasures such as the prosecution of those who produce or consume unauthorized material, with questionable results.

References

External links
 Athina Fragkouli: Greece: Copyright Act on European Audiovisual Observatory's IRIS Merlin database, 1995
 Prodromos K. Tsiavos: Copyright Law on Greek Law Digest, 2012
 Copyright, Related Rights and Cultural Matters (Law No. 2121/1993 as last amended by Law No. 3057/2002 (article 81) and by Law 3207/2003 (article 10 par. 33), on WIPO website.
 Petridis, Sotiris. “Comparative Issues on Copyright Protection for Films in the US and Greece.”  Journal of Intellectual Property Rights Vol. 19, Issue 4 (July 2014).

Law of Greece
Greece

el:Πνευματική ιδιοκτησία